CWA World Junior Heavyweight Championship was a professional wrestling junior heavyweight world championship in Catch Wrestling Association (CWA). The title was established in 1993 as a weight-class title along with the CWA World Middleweight Championship. Bonecrusher Sileo was crowned the inaugural champion by defeating Lance Storm at Clash of the Champions event on July 3, 1993. The title was defended in CWA until the promotion closed after holding its final event Euro Catch Festival on December 4, 1999. The champion Karsten Kretschmer then began defending the title in the German independent promotion Athletik Championship Wrestling (ACW), where he would lose the title to Eric Schwarz, who would retire the title in September 2000. The championship was contested under 12 three-minute rounds.

Title history

Combined reigns

Footnotes

References

Catch Wrestling Association championships
Junior heavyweight wrestling championships